30: Very Best of Deep Purple is a 1998 compilation album by English rock band Deep Purple, celebrating 30 years of the successful band. There are two CD versions of the album, a single CD and a double CD, and a vinyl version, a double LP printed on purple vinyl, with the track listing being identical to the single CD version.

The single CD version concentrates on the greatest hits of Deep Purple through the years, and contains mostly edited single versions of the songs, for example "Child in Time", which was over ten minutes long in its original form on the album Deep Purple in Rock. The double CD "Special Collectors Edition" is more in-depth, containing full versions of all the songs.

The album was certified Gold on 2 December 2005 by the BPI, selling 100,000 copies in the UK and reaching the Top 40. It peaked on the Australian charts at number 41.

Single CD version

Track listing

Credits 
 Ritchie Blackmore – guitar on tracks 1–14, and 16
 Jon Lord – keyboards on all tracks, backing vocals on track 1
 Ian Paice – drums on all tracks
 Nick Simper – bass and backing vocals on track 1
 Rod Evans – vocals on track 1
 Ian Gillan – vocals 2–12, and 16–18
 Roger Glover – bass and backing vocals on tracks 2–12 and 16–18
 David Coverdale – vocals on tracks 13–15
 Glenn Hughes – bass and vocals on tracks 13–15
 Tommy Bolin – guitar on track 15
 Steve Morse – guitar on tracks 17–18

Double CD version

Track listing

Credits 
 Ritchie Blackmore – guitar on disc 1 tracks 1–15, disc 2 tracks 1–7 and 9-11
 Jon Lord – keyboards on all tracks, backing vocals on disc 1 tracks 1–6
 Ian Paice – drums on all tracks
 Rod Evans – lead vocals on disc 1 tracks 1–6
 Nick Simper – bass & backing vocals on disc 1 tracks 1–6
 Ian Gillan – vocals on disc 1 tracks 7–15, disc 2 tracks 1–4, 9–10, and 12–13
 Roger Glover – bass on disc 1 tracks 7–15, disc 2 tracks 1–4 and 9–13
 David Coverdale – lead vocals on disc 2 tracks 5–8
 Glenn Hughes – bass & vocals on disc 2 tracks 5–8
 Tommy Bolin – guitar on disc 2 track 8
 Joe Lynn Turner – vocals on disc 2 track 11
 Steve Morse – guitar on disc 2 tracks 12–13

Charts

Certifications

References 

1998 greatest hits albums
Deep Purple compilation albums
EMI Records compilation albums
Albums produced by Roger Glover
Albums produced by Derek Lawrence
Albums recorded at IBC Studios